Ammodesmidae is a family of small millipedes endemic to Africa, containing seven species in two genera. Ammodesmids range from
 long with 18 or 19 body segments (including the telson) in both sexes, and are capable of rolling into a tight sphere.

Ammodesmidae contains two genera: Ammodesmus, with three species known from West Africa and the Democratic Republic of Congo, and Elassystremma, with four species known from East Africa. Adult Ammodesmus range from 1.4–2 mm in length, and adult males possess a last pair of legs strongly modified: bearing long whip-like bristles (setae) and with vestigial claws. Males of the genus Elassystremma lack the modified rear legs, and are larger, from 3.3–5 mm.

Ammodesmus
The genus Ammodesmus was named in 1896 by Orator F. Cook in the description of Ammodesmus granum. The genus was thought restricted to West Africa (Guinea, Liberia and Ivory Coast) until the 2015 description of A. congoensis from the Democratic Republic of the Congo. A. congoensis differs from the other two species in lacking ozopores (defensive glands), and has conspicuous sexual dimorphism, with females bearing sparse, long setae. A. congoensis and A. granum are notable as the only two species in the order Polydesmida in which each sex can have 18 or 19 segments; intraspecific variation in segment number within sex is rare in this order.
Ammodesmus congoensis VandenSpiegel & Golovatch, 2015
Ammodesmus granum Cook, 1896
Ammodesmus nimba VandenSpiegel & Golovatch, 2012

Elassystremma
The genus Elassystremma was established in 1981 by Richard L. Hoffman and K. M. Howell. Four species are known, occurring in Kenya, Tanzania, and Malawi.
Elassystremma laeve VandenSpiegel & Golovatch, 2004
Elassystremma michielsi VandenSpiegel & Golovatch, 2004
Elassystremma pongwe Hoffman & Howell, 1981
Elassystremma prolaeve VandenSpiegel & Golovatch, 2004

References

Polydesmida
Millipedes of Africa
Millipede families